Kutsev is a Slavic masculine surname, its feminine counterpart is Kutseva. Notable people with the surname include:

Anatoliy Kutsev (born 1959), Soviet football player and manager
Kaman Kutsev (born 1962), Bulgarian sprint canoer

Russian-language surnames